The 2018–19 FC Lokomotiv Moscow season was the club's 27th season in the Russian Premier League, the highest tier of the Russian football league system. Lokomotiv Moscow was the League defending champions. Lokomotiv Moscow also won the Russian Cup and took part in the Champions League. Lokomotiv also contested the Russian Super Cup.

Lokomotiv launched a women's team, which are participating in the Russian Women's Football Championship, the highest division in Russia for women football.

First team squad

Information

Players and squad numbers last updated on 20 February 2019.Note: Flags indicate national team as has been defined under FIFA eligibility rules. Players may hold more than one non-FIFA nationality.

Transfers

Arrivals

Departures

Friendlies

Pre-season

Competitions

Overview

Russian Super Cup

Russian Premier Liga

League table

Results by Round

Matches

Russian Cup

Champions League

Lokomotiv have qualified directly for the group stage of the 2018–19 UEFA Champions League League after winning the 2017–18 Russian Premier League.

Group stage

FC Kazanka Moscow

The 2018/19 FC Kazanka Moscow season will be the club's 2nd season in the Russian Professional Football League following the club's relaunch last year.

Squad information

Players and squad numbers last updated on 2 June 2019.Note: Flags indicate national team as has been defined under FIFA eligibility rules. Players may hold more than one non-FIFA nationality.

Russian professional football league – west

Results

WFC Lokomotiv Moscow

The 2018 WFC Lokomotiv Moscow season will be the club's 1st season in the Russian Women's Football Championship following the club's relaunch in April 2018. WFC Lokomotiv Moscow also took part in the Russian Women's Cup.

Squad information

Players and squad numbers last updated on 1 September 2018.Note: Flags indicate national team as has been defined under FIFA eligibility rules. Players may hold more than one non-FIFA nationality.

Russian Women's Football Championship

Results

Russian Women's Cup

References

FC Lokomotiv Moscow seasons
Lokomotiv Moscow
Lokomotiv Moscow